Alta, alah or mahavar is a red dye that is applied to the hands and feet of women, mainly in the Indian subcontinent. It is applied with a cotton swab or brush to the hands and feet during marriage ceremonies and festivals.

Alta is originally produced from lac, although today it is mainly replaced with synthetic dyes.

Cultural significance

Bengali culture 
Alta has great cultural significance in Bengali Culture. Regardless of religious beliefs, Bengali women in Bangladesh and Indian States of West Bengal as well as Tripura, Assam traditionally adorn their hands and feet with alta for marriage and cultural festivals like Pahela Baishakh, Pahela Falgun and others. Wearing Alta on Durga Pooja is a common ritual for Odia & Bengali womenfolk.

Odia culture 

Alta is also significant in Odisha. It can be commonly seen worn by Odissi classical dancers on hands and feet while performing. It is especially prevalent during Raja or Mithun Sanakranti, which is a three-day festival celebrating womanhood (menstruation). During this festival, as a part of the ritual, women apply alta on their feet symbolising fertility and auspiciousness. Alta and turmeric is also applied during marriages in Odia culture.

See also
 Henna
 Kumkum
 Sindoor

References

Indian culture
Indian wedding traditions
Bangladeshi culture
Bangladeshi wedding traditions
Festivals of Bangladeshi culture
Bengali culture
Festivals in India